Norwegian dialects (dialekter) are commonly divided into four main groups, 'Northern Norwegian', 'Central Norwegian' (trøndersk), 'Western Norwegian' (vestlandsk), and 'Eastern Norwegian'. Sometimes 'Midland Norwegian' and/or 'South Norwegian' are considered fifth or sixth groups.

The dialects are generally mutually intelligible, but differ significantly with regard to accent, grammar, syntax, and vocabulary. If not accustomed to a particular dialect, even a native Norwegian speaker may have difficulty understanding it. Dialects can be as local as farm clusters, but many linguists note an ongoing regionalization, diminishing or even elimination of local variations.

Trondheim), in national broadcasting, and in courts and official decrees.

Dialect groups 
 West and South Norwegian
 South Norwegian (Aust-Agder, most of Vest-Agder and Fyresdal, Nissedal, Drangedal and Kragerø in Telemark)
 South-West Norwegian (inner parts of Sogn og Fjordane, Hordaland (except the city of Bergen), Rogaland, and western parts of Vest-Agder)
 Bergen Norwegian or Bergensk (Bergen)
 North-West Norwegian (Romsdal, Sunnmøre, Nordfjord, Sunnfjord and outer parts of Sogn)
 North Norwegian
Helgeland Norwegian (Nordland county south of Saltfjellet, except for Bindal)
 Nordland Norwegian (Nordland county north of Saltfjellet)
 Troms Norwegian (Troms county, except for Bardu and Målselv)
 Finnmark Norwegian Finnmark county, except for Northern Kautokeino, Northern Karasjok, Tana and Nesseby.
 East Norwegian
 Vikvær Norwegian (Vestfold, Østfold, Bohuslän in Sweden, and adjacent lowland parts of Telemark, Buskerud and Akershus)
 Middle East Norwegian (Ringerike, Modum, Oslo and Romerike)
 Oppland Norwegian (southern Hedmark and south-eastern Oppland)
 Østerdal Norwegian (northern Hedmark and Bardu in northern Norway)
 Midland Norwegian
 Gudbrandsdal Norwegian (northern Oppland)
 Valdres and Hallingdal Norwegian (south-west Oppland and western Buskerud)
 Western Telemark Norwegian (Vinje, Tokke and Kviteseid)
 Eastern Telemark Norwegian (Tinn, Hjartdal, Midt-Telemark, Notodden and upper Numedal)
 Trøndelag Norwegian
 Outer Trøndelag Norwegian (Nordmøre, outer Sør-Trøndelag, and Fosen)
 Inner Trøndelag Norwegian (inner Sør-Trøndelag, Innherad, Lierne, and Snåsa)
 Trondheim Norwegian (Trondheim)
 Namdal Norwegian (Namdalen and surrounding coastal areas)
 South-eastern Trøndersk (Røros, Selbu, Tydal, Holtålen, Oppdal)
 Jämtlandic (Jämtland in Sweden)
 American Norwegian

Dialect branches 

 National Norwegian
 (Northern Norway)
  (Bodø)
 Brønnøy dialect (Brønnøy)
  (Helgeland)
 other dialects
 Trøndersk (Trøndelag)
 Trondheim dialect (Trondheim)
  (Fosen)
  (Härjedalen)
 Jämtland dialects (Jämtland province)
 Meldal dialect (Meldal)
  (Tydal)
 other dialects
 Vestlandsk (Western and Southern Norway)
 West (Vestlandet)
 Bergen dialect (Bergen)
  (Haugesund)
  (Jæren district)
  (Karmøy)
  (Nordmøre)
 
  (Sunndalsøra)
  (Romsdal)
 Sandnes dialect (Sandnes)
 Sogn dialect (Sogn district)
  (Sunnmøre)
 Stavanger dialect (Stavanger)
  (Midhordland district)
 South (Sørlandet)
 Arendal dialect (Arendal region)
  (Upper Setesdal, Valle)
 other dialects
  (Eastern Norway)
 (Lowland districts)
Vikværsk dialects (Viken district)
 Drammen dialect (Drammen region)
 Follo dialect (Follo)
  (Vestfold)
 Tønsberg dialect (Tønsberg and Færder)
  (Andebu)
  (Re)
 Østfold dialects (Østfold)
 Fredrikstad dialect (Fredrikstad region)
 Inner Østfold dialect (Inner Østfold)
  (Bohuslän province)
  (Grenland district)
  (Mid-east districts)
Urban East Norwegian
Oslo dialect (Oslo)
Asker and Bærum dialect, this is the dialect that is closest to the standard Norwegian language. (Asker and Bærum)
Romerike dialect (Romerike)
 (Ringerike district)
 (Hønefoss)
 (Ådal)
 (Modum)
 (Opplandene district)
 Hedmark dialects (Hedmark)
  (Solør)
  (Hadeland district)
  (Viken district)
 Särna-Idre dialect (Särna and Idre)
  (Midland districts)
 Gudbrandsdal dialect (Gudbrandsdalen, Oppland and Upper Folldal, Hedmark)
 Hallingdal-Valdres dialects (Hallingdal, Valdres)
 
 Valdris dialect (Valdres district)
 Telemark-Numedal dialects (Telemark and Numedal)
 
 other dialects

Evolution 
Owing to geography and climate, Norwegian communities were often isolated from each other until the early 20th century.  As a result, local dialects had a tendency to be influenced by each other in singular ways while developing their own idiosyncrasies.  The community of Oppdal, for example, has characteristics in common with coastal dialects to the west, the dialects of northern Gudbrandsdalen to the south, and other dialects in Sør-Trøndelag from the north. The linguist Einar Haugen documented the particulars of the Oppdal dialect, and the writer Inge Krokann used it as a literary device. Other transitional dialects include the dialects of Romsdal and Arendal.

On the other hand, newly industrialized communities near sources of hydroelectric power have developed dialects consistent with the region but in many ways unique. Studies in such places as Høyanger, Odda, Tyssedal, Rjukan, Notodden, Sauda, and others show that koineization has effected the formation of new dialects in these areas.

Similarly, in the early 20th century a dialect closely approximating standard Bokmål arose in and around railway stations.

Social dynamics 

Until the 20th century, upward social mobility in a city like Oslo could in some cases require conforming speech to standard Riksmål. Studies show that even today, speakers of rural dialects may tend to change their usage in formal settings to approximate the formal written language. This has led to various countercultural movements ranging from the adoption of traditional forms of Oslo dialects among political radicals in Oslo, to movements preserving local dialects. There is widespread and growing acceptance that Norwegian linguistic diversity is worth preserving.

The trend today is a regionalisation of the dialects causing smaller dialectal traits to disappear and rural dialects to merge with their nearest larger dialectal variety.

There is no standard dialect for the Norwegian language as a whole, and all dialects are by now mutually intelligible. Hence, widely different dialects are used frequently and alongside each other, in almost every aspect of society. Criticism of a dialect may be considered criticism of someone's personal identity and place of upbringing, and is considered impolite. Not using one's proper dialect would be bordering on awkward in many situations, as it may signal a wish to take on an identity or a background which one does not have. Dialects are also an area from which to derive humour both in professional and household situations.

Distinctions 
There are many ways to distinguish among Norwegian dialects.  These criteria are drawn from the work Vårt Eget Språk/Talemålet (1987) by Egil Børre Johnsen.  These criteria generally provide the analytical means for identifying most dialects, though most Norwegians rely on experience to tell them apart.

Grammars and syntax

Infinitive forms 
One of the most important differences among dialects is which ending, if any, verbs have in the infinitive form. In Old Norwegian, most verbs had an infinitive ending (-a), and likewise in a modern Norwegian dialect, most of the verbs of the dialect either have or would have had an infinitive ending. There are five varieties of the infinitive ending in Norwegian dialects, constituting two groups:

One ending (western dialects)
 Infinitive ending with -a, e.g., common in southwestern Norway, including the areas surrounding Bergen (although not in the city of Bergen itself) and Stavanger
 Infinitive ending with -e, e.g., common in Troms, Finnmark, areas of Sogn og Fjordane and Møre og Romsdal, Southern counties, and a few other areas.
 Apocopic infinitive, where no vowel is added to the infinitive form, e.g., common in certain areas of Nordland

Two different endings (eastern dialects)
 Split infinitive, in which some verbs end with -a while others end with -e; e.g.  versus , common in Eastern Norway
 Split infinitive, with apocope, e.g.,  (//) versus , common in some areas in Sør-Trøndelag and Nord-Trøndelag

The split distribution of endings is related to the syllable length of the verb in Old Norse. "Short-syllable" verbs in Norse kept their endings. The "long-syllable" verbs lost their (unstressed) endings or had them converted to -e.

Dative case 
The original Germanic contextual difference between the dative and accusative cases, standardized in modern German and Icelandic, has degenerated in spoken Danish and Swedish, a tendency which spread to Bokmål too. Ivar Aasen treated the dative case in detail in his work, Norsk Grammatik (1848), and use of Norwegian dative as a living grammatical case can be found in a few of the earliest Landsmål texts. However, the dative case has never been part of official Landsmål/Nynorsk.

It is, however, present in some spoken dialects north of Oslo, Romsdal, and south and northeast of Trondheim. The grammatical phenomenon is highly threatened in the mentioned areas, while most speakers of conservative varieties have been highly influenced by the national standard languages, using only the traditional accusative word form in both cases. Often, though not always, the difference in meaning between the dative and accusative word forms can thus be lost, requiring the speaker to add more words to specify what was actually meant, to avoid potential loss of information.

Future tense 
There are regional variations in the use of future tense, for example, "He is going to travel.":
 .
 .
 .
 .

Syntax 
Syntax can vary greatly between dialects, and the tense is important for the listener to get the meaning. For instance, a question can be formed without the traditional "asking-words" (how, where, what, who..)

For example, the sentence ? (in Bokmål), ? (in Nynorsk), literally: "How much is the clock?" i.e. "What time is it?"  can be put in, among others, the following forms:
 ? (Is the clock much?) (stress is on "the clock")
 ? (Is it much, the clock?) (stress on "is")
 ? (literally: "What is the clock?")
 ? (literally: What the clock is?), or, using another word for clock, ?
 ? (literally: What is she?).

Pronunciation of vowels

Diphthongization of monophthongs 

West Norwegian dialects have also innovated new diphthongs. In Midtre you can find the following:

Monophthongization of diphthongs 

This shift originated in Old East Norse, which is reflected in the fact that Swedish and Danish overwhelmingly exhibit this change. Monophthongization in Norway ends on the coast west of Trondheim and extends southeast in a triangle into central Sweden.

Leveling 
(/ in Norwegian) This is a phenomenon in which the root vowel and end vowel in a word approximate each other. There are two varieties in Norwegian dialects – one in which the two vowels become identical, the other where they are only similar. Leveling exists only in inland areas in Southern Norway, and areas around Trondheim.

Vowel shift in strong verbs 
In all but Oslo and coastal areas just south of the capital, the present tense of certain verbs take on a new vowel (umlaut), e.g.,  becomes  (in Oslo, it becomes ).

Pronunciation of consonants

Eliminating  in the plural indefinite form 
There are four categories:
 The  is retained – most of Eastern Norway, the South-Eastern coast, and across to areas north and east of Stavanger.
 The  disappears altogether – Southern tip of Norway, coastal areas north of Bergen, and inland almost to Trondheim.
 The  is retained in certain words but not in others – coastal areas around Trondheim, and most of Northern Norway
 The  is retained in certain words and in weak feminine nouns, but not in others – one coast area in Nordland.

Phonetic realization of  
Most dialects realize  as the alveolar tap  or alveolar trill . However, for the last 200 years the uvular approximant  has been gaining ground in Western and Southern Norwegian dialects, with Kristiansand, Stavanger, and Bergen as centers. The uvular R has also been adopted in aspiring patricians in and around Oslo, to the point that it was for some time fashionable to "import" governesses from the Kristiansand area. In certain regions, such as Oslo, the flap has become realized as a retroflex flap (generally called "thick L") , which exists only in Norway, a few regions in Sweden, and in completely unrelated languages. The sound coexists with other retroflexions in Norwegian dialects. The uvular R has gained less acceptance in eastern regions, and linguists speculate that dialects that use retroflexes have a "natural defense" against uvular R and thus will not adopt it. However, the dialect of Arendal retains the retroflexes, while featuring the uvular R in remaining positions, e.g.  .

In large parts of Northern Norway, especially in the northern parts of Nordland county and southern parts of the former county of Troms, as well as several parts of the former county of Finnmark, another variant is still common: the voiced post-alveolar sibilant fricative .

Palatalization 
In areas north of an isogloss running between Oslo and Bergen, palatalization occurs for the n (IPA ), l, t and d sounds in varying degrees.  Areas just south and southwest of Trondheim palatalize both the main and subordinate syllable in words (e.g.), but other areas only palatalize the main syllable.

Voicing of plosives 
Voiceless stops have become voiced intervocalically after long vowels (vs.) on the extreme southern coast of Norway, including Kristiansand, Mandal and Stavanger.  The same phenomenon appears in Sør-Trøndelag and one area in Nordland.

Segmentation 
The geminate  in southwestern Norway has become , while just east in southcentral Norwegian the final  is lost, leaving .  The same sequence has been palatalized in Northern Norway, leaving the palatal lateral .

Assimilation 
Western Norway, though not in Bergen, retains the  cluster. In Northern Norway this same cluster is realized as the palatal lateral .

Consonant shift in conjugation of masculine nouns 
This is found in rural dialects along the coast from Farsund to the border between Troms and Finnmark.

The kj - sj merger 
This is by many considered to be a normal development in language change (although as most language changes, the older generation and more conservative language users often lament the degradation of the language). The functional load is relatively low, and as often happens, similar sounds with low functional loads merge.

Tonemes and intonation 

There are great differences between the intonation systems of different Norwegian dialects.

Vocabulary

First person pronoun, nominative plural 
Three variations of the first person plural nominative pronoun exist in Norwegian dialects:
 , (pronounced ), common in parts of Eastern Norway, most of Northern Norway, coastal areas close to Trondheim, and one sliver of Western Norway
 , common in areas of Sør-Trøndelag, Gudbrandsdalen, Nordmøre and parts of Sunnmøre.

First person pronoun, nominative singular 
There is considerable variety in the way the first person singular nominative pronoun is pronounced in Norwegian dialects.  They appear to fall into three groups, within which there are also variations:
This is common in most of Southern and Western Norway, Trøndelag, and most of Northern Norway. In some areas of Western Norway, it is common to say .
  (pronounced ), in a few areas in Western Norway (Romsdal/Molde) and Snåsa in Nord Trøndelag
  , jè , or jei , in areas around Oslo, and north along the Swedish border, almost to Trondheim, as well as one region in Troms

Personal pronouns

Possessive pronouns

The word "not" 
The Norwegian word for the English not exists in these main categories:
   – Oslo, Kristiansand, Bergen, Ålesund, most of Finnmark, Vestfold and lowland parts of Telemark, and some cities in Nordland.
   – most of Southern, Northern, Western Norway and high-land parts of Telemark.
   – Trøndelag
   - parts of Salten District, Nordland
   or ittje  – areas north of Oslo, along the Swedish border
  , ente  or ette  – Mostly along the Swedish border south of Oslo in Østfold
 /
 /

Examples of the sentence "I am not hungry," in Norwegian:
 : . (Bokmål)
 : . (Nynorsk)
 : . (Romsdal)
 : . (Trøndelag)
 : . (Salten)
 : . (Narvik)
 : . (Hærland)

Interrogative words 
Some common interrogative words take on forms such as:

See also 
 Standard East Norwegian
 Kebabnorsk
 Bokmål and Nynorsk

References

Sources 
Jahr, Ernst Håkon (1990) Den Store dialektboka (Oslo: Novus) 
Kristoffersen, Gjert (2000) The Phonology of Norwegian (Oxford University Press) 
Vanvik, Arne (1979) Norsk fonetikk (Oslo: Universitetet i Oslo)

Further reading 
Vikør, Lars S.  (2001) The Nordic languages. Their Status and Interrelations (Oslo: Novus Press)  
Johnsen, Egil Børre (1987) Vårt Eget Språk/Talemålet (H. Aschehoug & Co.)

External links 
 Norwegian Language Council
 Measuring the "distance" between the Norwegian dialects
 En norsk dialektprøvedatabase på nettet, a Norwegian database of dialect samples.
 , introduction to Northern Norwegian dialects written in English

 
Norwegian language
Norwegian